Sulefjellet is a mountain in Norway. The mountain sits along the border of Vang Municipality in Innlandet county and Lærdal Municipality in Vestland county. The mountain is surrounded by several other notable mountains including Suletinden to the northwest, Skoddetinden and Tverrfjellet to the east, and Høgeloft to the south.

See also
List of mountains of Norway by height

References

Lærdal
Vang, Innlandet
Mountains of Innlandet
Mountains of Vestland